Frédéric Dobraje (born 17 May 1955) is a French former professional footballer who played as a goalkeeper. He also worked as an agent and sporting director.

Post-playing career 
Dobraje became an agent in 1986, while simultaneously playing football. Based in Troyes, he notably rubbed elbows with Bernard Tapie when he was the president of Marseille. Dobraje went on to become the agent of over 200 players, notably including François Brisson, Robert Pires, Bixente Lizarazu, and Stéphane Guivarc'h; he also became the agent of managers Rudi Garcia, Alain Perrin, Guy Stéphan, and Jean-Marc Furlan. In 2000, after having negotiated the transfer of Pires from Marseille to Arsenal, Dobraje was the subject of threats from several people who wanted a part of his agent fee that he made from the transfer.

In March 2009, Dobraje became the sporting director of Dijon. He left this role in November due to personal reasons.

Honours 
Tours

 Division 2: 1983–84
Individual

 Division 2 Player of the Year: 1981

References

External links 
 

1955 births
Living people
People from Douai
Sportspeople from Nord (French department)
French footballers
Association football goalkeepers
INF Vichy players
RC Lens players
Racing Besançon players
Angoulême Charente FC players
SC Bastia players
Olympique Thonon Chablais players
Stade Brestois 29 players
Tours FC players
AS Béziers Hérault (football)
Limoges FC players
FC Sochaux-Montbéliard players
Bourges 18 players
US Pont-de-Roide players
Ligue 2 players
Ligue 1 players
French Division 3 (1971–1993) players
Division d'Honneur players
Championnat National 3 players
Association football agents
Dijon FCO non-playing staff
Footballers from Hauts-de-France